Petjo, also known as Petjoh, Petjok, Pecok, Petjoek is a Dutch-based creole language that originated among the Indos, people of mixed Dutch and Indonesian ancestry in the former Dutch East Indies. The language has influences from Dutch and then depending on the region Javanese, Malay,  Sundanese and Betawi. Its speakers presently live mostly in Indonesia and the Netherlands. The language is expected to become gradually extinct by the end of the 21st century, due to Indos' shift toward Indonesian in Indonesia and Dutch in the Netherlands.

Background

Just as the Indo (Eurasian) community historically originated from relationships between European males and Indonesian females, its language reflects this same origin. Typified as a mixed-marriage language, the grammar of Petjok is based on the maternal Malay language and the lexicon on the paternal Dutch language.

The main contact mechanisms responsible for the creation of Petjok are lexical re-orientation; selective replication and convergence. The original speakers of the language do not necessarily want to maintain their first language, but rather create a second one. These creative speakers of the language were probably bilingual, but more fluent in the dominant lingua franca i.e., native Malay language, than Dutch language.

In its overall split between grammar and lexicon, the structure of Petjok is very similar to the Media Lengua spoken in Ecuador by the Quechua Indians, with the critical difference that the much older language, Pecok, has undergone late system morphemes and syntactic blends.

The most important author that published literary work in this language is the Indo (Eurasian) writer Tjalie Robinson.

Each urban area with a large Indo community had their own variation of Petjok. For example: the Petjok of Batavia was influenced by a form of Malay which contained many Chinese words, in Bandung, many Sundanese words were used, while in Semarang and Surabaya many Javanese words were in use.

Petjo should not be confused with Javindo, a different creole language spoken by Indos in the Dutch East Indies.

Largely an oral language, there is no standard spelling for the language. Texts may be written using what is known as the old spelling (Ejaan Tempo Dulu) or the Indonesian Enhanced Spelling (Ejaan Yang Disempurnakan). Some spelling differences (new vs old) are: j=dj, u=oe, y=j, c=tj, ny=nj, sy=sj, and kh=ch.

Phonology 
Petjo's phonology is based on the Malay phonology. This means that both words in Malay and in Dutch sound sequences in syllables are lengthened, consonants and vowels are likely to overlap each other (CVCV); some consonants that follow each other (consonant clusters) are most likely to be avoided. The following will give an example of an 'e' which is spoken unstressed (schwa insertion) or the consonant is omitted.

Consonants

Consonant shifts 
The suprasegmental aspects – word stress and intonation – in Petjo are very similar to Malay; Petjo has a striking zinsmelodie (rhythm) compared to Dutch. In addition, Petjo has a different consonant pronunciation compared to Dutch. Below is a shift in the pronunciation of voiced consonants to voiceless in Petjo.

Consonant blends 
The combination of consonants also for many Petjo speakers becomes an insurmountable problem. Petjo speakers will usually omit some sounds or add others in between to get a slightly flexible tongue to pronounce a combination of consonants.

Vowels 
In Petjo's pronunciation, all vowels are pronounced nasally. Long and closed sounds are pronounced open or wide. Long sounds are often pronounced shorter and short sounds made longer compared to Dutch pronunciation, or speakers of these languages change the sound:

Language samples

Fragment from Petjoh van Batavia 
From Tjalie Robinson, Ik en Bentiet:

I say: "Als so, alleen djoeloeng-djoeloeng jij fang!"

He say: "Itoe diejè!"

I say: "Njang klein-klein fóór wat?"

He say: "Foor kwamaroem".

I say: "Foor wat?"

He say: Foor waramoeki".

I say: So-euven jij seh anders".

He say: "Ha-a. Muuleke woort dese. Laat maar dese woort, alsmaar ding-nja hoet".

I say: "Wat foor ding, dese ding. Lekker?"

He say: "Masa lekker. Als jij denken freten door maar-door jij".

References

Citations

Bibliography
Cress, R.(1998): Petjoh. Woorden en wetenswaardigheden uit het Indische verleden. Amsterdam, Prometheus.
Rickford, J.R. & Mc Worther, J (1997): “Language contact and language generation: Pidgins and Creoles”. In: F. Coulmas (red), The handbook of sociolinguistics. Oxford, Blackwell, p. 238–256.
Riyanto, Sugeng (1996): “Het ontstaan en de structuur van het Petjoek”, In: Darmojuwono, Setiawati; Suratminto, Lilie (red): Duapuluh lima tahun studi Belanda di Indonesia/ Vijfentwintig jaar studie Nederlands in Indonesië. p. 209–218
Van Rheeden, Hadewych A. (1995): "Het Petjo van Batavia – ontstaan en structuur van de taal van de Indo's", Amsterdam: Universiteit van Amsterdam, Instituut voor Algemene Taalwetenschap

External links
 University of Colorado paper by Elly Amade

Dutch-based pidgins and creoles
Languages of Indonesia
Dutch language in Asia